The Olympia and Belmore Railroad  is a short-line railroad headquartered in Centralia, Washington, USA. The railroad operates a line leased from the BNSF Railway which runs between Olympia and Belmore. The company began operations in 2016. It is a subsidiary of Genesee & Wyoming.

History 
The Genesee & Wyoming formed the company in 2016 to lease a  BNSF Railway line between Olympia and Belmore. The line primarily carries traffic from Olympia's port facilities. Tacoma Rail had leased the line from 2004 to 2016 but chose not to renew.

References

External links 
 Olympia and Belmore Railroad official webpage - Genesee and Wyoming website
 Olympia and Belmore RR information page, Union Pacific RR

Genesee & Wyoming
Railway companies established in 2016
American companies established in 2016
Washington (state) railroads
Standard gauge railways in the United States
2016 establishments in Washington (state)